The Homestead Grays Bridge, also known as the (Homestead) High Level Bridge, was built in 1936 and spans the Monongahela River between Homestead Borough and the southernmost tip of Pittsburgh's Squirrel Hill neighborhood. It is notable as the first bridge to incorporate the Wichert Truss, which uses a quadrilateral shape over each support, into its design. This made the truss statically determinate, so that forces in the structural members could be calculated. There are very few surviving Wichert Truss bridges, including one other example in Pittsburgh, the Charles Anderson Memorial Bridge.

History

The bridge was dedicated on Saturday November 20, 1937, having cost the county of Allegheny $2.75 million to build and originally carried four highway lanes and two streetcar tracks of Pittsburgh Railways Company. It replaced the 1897 Brown's Bridge (Homestead and Highland Bridge) which was upstream and had linked Brown's Hill Rd on the north bank and Second Avenue between Ann Street and Amity Street, Homestead on the south bank.

On July 11, 2002, the Homestead High-Level Bridge was renamed the Homestead Grays Bridge in honor of the Homestead Grays baseball team.

The bridge had grown dilapidated since its last renovation in 1979. In 2006 and 2007 work was undertaken to rehabilitate the bridge: the deck was removed and the structure stripped down to the steel, then the steel structure repaired and a new, wider deck put on.  The new deck is six feet wider in traffic lanes—three feet on each side—and also has broader pedestrian walkways. The railings and lighting were replaced with reproductions of historic models, and the entire structure received a new coat of blue-grey paint.

See also
List of crossings of the Monongahela River

References

External links

Pittsburgh bridges
"Homestead Grays Bridge work set for March" (Pittsburgh Post-Gazette)
Homestead span honors baseball team — Pittsburgh Post-Gazette article on the renaming of the Homestead Grays Bridge
Why was it called the "High-Level" Bridge? — Pittsburgh City Paper column explaining some of the history of the bridge
Homestead Grays bridge to gain 18 plaques honoring Negro League Greats
Bridges and Tunnels of Allegheny County "Homestead High-Level Bridge"

Bridges in Pittsburgh
Bridges over the Monongahela River
Bridges completed in 1937
Homestead Grays
Road bridges on the National Register of Historic Places in Pennsylvania
Pittsburgh History & Landmarks Foundation Historic Landmarks
Homestead, Pennsylvania
National Register of Historic Places in Pittsburgh
Steel bridges in the United States
1937 establishments in Pennsylvania